Sebastián Báez was the defending champion but chose not to defend his title.

Hugo Dellien won the title after defeating Alejandro Tabilo 6–3, 4–6, 6–4 in the final.

Seeds

Draw

Finals

Top half

Bottom half

References

External links
Main draw
Qualifying draw

Challenger de Santiago - 1
2022 Singles